Participatory Democracy Party (Turkish: Katılımcı Demokrasi Partisi, KADEP) is a pro-Kurdish rights party in Turkey. The party was created in 2006 by Şerafettin Elçi, the former Minister of Public Works.

In the 2011 Turkish general election Elçi run with the Labour, Democracy and Freedom Bloc and was elected for Diyarbakır Province.

On May 27 2019, party merged into Turkey Kurdistan Democratic Party.

See also
Racism in Turkey
Kurds in Turkey
Human rights of Kurdish people in Turkey

References

2006 establishments in Turkey
Kurdish nationalist political parties
Defunct Kurdish parties in Turkey
Political parties established in 2006
Regionalist parties
Defunct social democratic parties in Turkey